Sveta Petka (Sv. Petka) is the Bulgarian, Serbian and Macedonian name for Saint Parascheva of the Balkans, which may refer to:

Villages
 Sveta Petka, Bujanovac, Serbia
 Sveta Petka, Sopište, North Macedonia
 Sveta Petka, Velingrad, Bulgaria

Church buildings
 A monastery in the village Brajčino in the North Macedonia
 Sveta Petka, Lenište in the abandoned village of Lenište, North Macedonia
 Chapel of Saint Petka in Belgrade, Serbia
 Saint Petka Church (Lakeshore, Ontario)
 Church of St. Petka in Staničenje, Serbia
 Church of St Petka of the Saddlers, Sofia, Bulgaria
 Church of the Holy Venerable Mother Parascheva, Croatia